Tomas Ó Con Ceanainn, Lord of Uí Díarmata, died 1478.

Overview

Sub anno 1478, the Annals of the Four Masters state that

Thomas O'Concannon, Lord of Hy-Diarmada, was slain by the son of his own brother"

He was succeeded by William, who died later the same year.

References

 Vol. 2 (AD 903–1171): edition and translation
 Annals of Ulster at CELT: Corpus of Electronic Texts at University College Cork
 Annals of Tigernach at CELT: Corpus of Electronic Texts at University College Cork
Revised edition of McCarthy's synchronisms at Trinity College Dublin.

People from County Galway
Medieval Gaels from Ireland
Irish lords
1478 deaths
15th-century Irish people
Year of birth unknown